The 1981 Geneva Open was a men's tennis tournament played on clay courts that was part of the 1981 Volvo Grand Prix. It was played at Geneva, Switzerland and was held from 21 September until 27 September 1981. First-seeded Björn Borg won the singles title.

Finals

Singles

 Björn Borg defeated  Tomáš Šmíd 6–4, 6–3
 It was Borg's 3rd singles title of the year and the 66th and last of his career.

Doubles

 Heinz Günthardt /  Balázs Taróczy defeated  Pavel Složil /  Tomáš Šmíd 6–4, 3–6, 6–2
 It was Günthardt's 7th title of the year and the 17th of his career. It was Taróczy's 6th title of the year and the 23rd of his career.

References

External links
 ITF tournament edition details

 
20th century in Geneva